Helgesson is a surname. Notable people with the surname include:

Joshi Helgesson (born 1993), Swedish figure skater
Mats Helgesson, Swedish Air Force major general
Therese Islas Helgesson (born 1983), Swedish handball player
Tommie Helgesson or Snowy Shaw (born 1968), Swedish heavy metal musician
Viktoria Helgesson (born 1988), Swedish figure skater

See also
Helgason
Helgesen

Swedish-language surnames
Patronymic surnames
Surnames from given names